Incisura is a genus of sea snails or keyhole limpets, marine gastropod molluscs in the family Scissurellidae.

Species
Species within the genus Incisura include:
 Incisura auriformis Geiger & Jansen, 2004
 Incisura lytteltonensis (E. A. Smith, 1894)
 Incisura remota (Iredale, 1924)
 Incisura rosea (Hedley, 1904)

Species brought into synonymy
 Incisura obliqua (Watson, 1886): synonym of  Scissurella obliqua Watson, 1886
 Incisura vincentiana (Cotton, 1945): synonym of Incisura remota (Iredale, 1924)

References

 Powell A. W. B., New Zealand Mollusca, William Collins Publishers Ltd, Auckland, New Zealand 1979 
 Geiger D.L. (2003) Phylogenetic assessment of characters proposed for the generic classification of Recent Scissurellidae (Gastropoda: Vetigastropoda) with a description of one new genus and six new species from Easter Island and Australia. Molluscan Research 23: 21-83
  Geiger D.L. (2012) Monograph of the little slit shells. Volume 1. Introduction, Scissurellidae. pp. 1–728. Volume 2. Anatomidae, Larocheidae, Depressizonidae, Sutilizonidae, Temnocinclidae. pp. 729–1291. Santa Barbara Museum of Natural History Monographs Number 7.

Scissurellidae
Gastropods of New Zealand